Melvyn Hayes (né Hyams; 11 January 1935) is an English actor and voice over performer. He is best known for playing the effeminate Gunner (later Bombardier) "Gloria" Beaumont in the 1970s BBC sitcom It Ain't Half Hot Mum, for appearing in the Cliff Richard musical films The Young Ones, Summer Holiday and Wonderful Life as well as Here Come the Double Deckers (1970–1971).

Professional career

Early life and stage roles
Born in Wandsworth, South London, Hayes attended Sir Walter St John's Grammar School For Boys, Battersea. As a youth he worked in Fleet Street, carrying advertising print blocks between newspapers. In 1950 he saw an advertisement seeking an assistant for the conjurer The Great Massoni. He got the job and was soon "disappearing twice daily for £4 per week" performing the Indian rope trick in Maskelyne's Mysteries at The Comedy Theatre in London. He was also in a theatrical troupe called Terry's Juveniles, and later appeared in repertory theatres in Surrey, Derbyshire and the Midlands. 
 
He has appeared in pantomimes as dames in Christmas productions of Sleeping Beauty as Nanny Nellie and Aladdin as Widow Twankey

Film
His film roles include the young Victor Frankenstein in The Curse of Frankenstein (1957), Willem in Operation Amsterdam (1959), Cecil Biggs in Bottoms Up (1960), Jimmy in The Young Ones (1961) with Cliff Richard, Cyril in Summer Holiday (1963), again with Cliff Richard and 'Brother' Willy in Crooks in Cloisters (1964).

Voice roles
Hayes has performed voices on children's cartoons such as SuperTed, The Dreamstone, Little Dracula, Alfred J. Kwak, Pongwiffy and Budgie the Little Helicopter.

Television
One of his earliest roles was in the BBC Billy Bunter of Greyfriars School. He played Edek in The Silver Sword (by Ian Serraillier) in 1957, a children's television production about Polish refugees trying to find their parent after World War II. Hayes featured in It Ain't Half Hot Mum (1974–1981), as Gunner "Gloria" Beaumont for the first two series, then, after Bombardier Solomon left, he was promoted to bombardier.

Other roles include parts in EastEnders as Michael Rawlins. Carry On England, Love Thy Neighbour, The Thin Blue Line, Here Come the Double Deckers, Potter's Picture Palace (1976 & 1978) and the final series of Drop the Dead Donkey. He also provided the voice to characters in the English translation of the cartoon Alfred J. Kwak. In March 2011, Hayes appeared as Mr Pink in the ITV1 comedy TV series Benidorm. He was also in the Doctor Who - The Companion Chronicles audio The Scorchies (2013).

Personal life
Hayes first married actress Rosalind Allan, with whom he has two daughters and one son. He has two daughters with his second wife, former actress and theatrical agent Wendy Padbury; their daughter, Charlie Hayes, also became an actress. He is now married to Jayne Male and lives in Ryde on the Isle of Wight. Hayes has one child with Male.

He was at one time the pub landlord of the Stag Inn in the village of Offchurch in Warwickshire the White Hart Tap in St Albans, Hertfordshire, and The Brantham Bull, Brantham, Suffolk.

Hayes is a member of the Grand Order of Water Rats and in 2004, was made King Rat.

Filmography

 Adventure in the Hopfields (1953)
 The Man Who Loved Redheads (1955)
 Fun at St. Fanny's (1956)
 The Curse of Frankenstein (1957)
 Violent Playground (1958)
 Operation Amsterdam (1959)
 No Trees in the Street (1959)
 The Flesh and the Fiends (1960)
 Bottoms Up (1960)
 The Young Ones (1961)
 The Silent Invasion (1962)
 Summer Holiday (1963)
 Crooks in Cloisters (1964)
 Wonderful Life  (1964)
 A Walk with Love and Death (1969)
 Go for a Take (1972)
 Love Thy Neighbour (1973)
 Man About the House (1974)
 Carry On England (1976)
 What's Up Superdoc! (1978)
 A Touch of the Sun (1979)
 The Zany Adventures of Robin Hood (1984)
 Santa Claus: The Movie (1985)
 King of the Wind (1990)

References

External links

Living people
1935 births
English male film actors
English male voice actors
English male television actors
20th-century English male actors
21st-century English male actors
Pantomime dames
People from Ryde
People educated at Sir Walter St John's Grammar School For Boys
British male comedy actors